Gaston is an unincorporated community in Lewis County, West Virginia, United States.

The community was named after Isaac and Langford Gaston, early settlers.

References 

Unincorporated communities in West Virginia
Unincorporated communities in Lewis County, West Virginia